Lilianny Marsillan Agüero (born ) is a Cuban female volleyball player. She was part of the Cuba women's national volleyball team.

Career
She played the 2009 FIVB U20 World Championship with her junior national team. She left the Cuban team before the 2013 FIVB Volleyball World Grand Prix.

References

External links
 FIVB Profile

1991 births
Living people
Cuban women's volleyball players
People from Cienfuegos
21st-century Cuban women